The 76th annual Cannes Film Festival is an upcoming film festival due to take place from 16 to 27 May 2023.

Official selection
Pedro Almodóvar's western Strange Way of Life is slated to be the opening night film at the festival. Other films set to premiere include Brillante Mendoza's film Bangsamoro, Blessy's survival drama film Aadujeevitham, and Martin Scorsese's Killers of the Flower Moon. In February 2023, two Pakistani films were set to premiere at the festival, Pehchaan and Noor.

Juries

Main competition
 Ruben Östlund, Swedish director, Jury President

References

External links
 

2023 film festivals
2023